WNSC-TV (channel 30) is a PBS member television station in Rock Hill, South Carolina, United States. It is owned by the South Carolina Educational Television Commission alongside news/talk radio station WNSC-FM (88.9). WNSC-TV's studios are located on the campus of York Technical College in Rock Hill, and its transmitter is located in southeastern York County (east of I-77).

WNSC-TV operates as a member station of South Carolina Educational Television (SCETV). Master control and most internal operations are based at SCETV's headquarters on George Rogers Boulevard in Columbia, across from Williams-Brice Stadium on the campus of the University of South Carolina. On cable, WNSC-TV is available on channel 15 throughout most of the Charlotte, North Carolina television market.

History
The station first signed on the air on January 3, 1978, initially broadcasting instructional programs during the day before beginning full-time broadcasting in July. (WPRV, now WNSC-FM, signed on the same day.) WNSC debuted as the sixth full-power station aligned with SCETV, and the third public television station to serve the Charlotte area, after WTVI (channel 42) and Concord-based UNC-TV station WUNG-TV (channel 58). Previously, SCETV programming had been seen in the Rock Hill area via low-power translator station W55AA on UHF channel 55 (that channel was later occupied by MyNetworkTV affiliate WMYT-TV).

Programming
WNSC-TV originates some local programming, including Piedmont Politics, and also carries national and statewide programs from PBS and SCETV. Its digital subchannels carry the South Carolina Channel, ETV World and SCETV PBS Kids.

Local and regional programming
Talk of the Town – a community affairs talk show hosted by Bill Curry
Mary Long's Yesteryear – hosted by Mary Long
Fret & Fiddle – a songwriter performance showcase
Metrolina Illustrated Newsmagazine created, hosted and produced by Chuck Smith (1988–1991)
Rock Hill: Primetime – created and produced by Chuck Smith (1991–1992)
Carolina Weekends – created, hosted and produced by Chuck Smith (1988–1991)

Technical information

Subchannels
The station's digital signal is multiplexed:

Analog-to-digital conversion
WNSC-TV shut down its analog signal, over UHF channel 30, at midnight on February 18, 2009 (along with the other SCETV stations), the day after some full-power television stations in the United States transitioned from analog to digital broadcasts (February 17 was the original target date for the transition until the Federal Communications Commission moved the transition date to June 12 earlier in the month). The station's digital signal remained on its pre-transition UHF channel 15. Through the use of PSIP, digital television receivers display the station's virtual channel as its former UHF analog channel 30.

References

External links 
www.scetv.org/ - South Carolina ETV official website

South Carolina Educational Television
NSC-TV
PBS member stations
Rock Hill, South Carolina
Television channels and stations established in 1978
1978 establishments in South Carolina